Zav-e Bala (also Romanized as Zāv-e Bālā; also known as Zāv) is a village in Zavkuh Rural District, Pishkamar District, Kalaleh County, Golestan Province, Iran. At the 2006 census, its population was 443, in 98 families.

References 

Populated places in Kalaleh County